Potomac and Rappahannock Transportation Commission (PRTC) is an American public transportation system in Prince William County, Virginia, Stafford County, Virginia, and Spotsylvania County, Virginia, plus two adjacent independent cities, Manassas and Manassas Park. Services provided by PRTC include OmniRide, OmniRide Local, and OmniRide Ridesharing Service operating in Prince William County, Manassas, Manassas Park, and Stafford County. Spotsylvania County's membership is solely based on a membership requirement due to the VRE operations in the county and the state aid that comes with the VRE.

Organization
The Commission was established in 1986.  It consists of representatives from each local jurisdiction, the Chairman of the Commonwealth Transportation Board and two members of the House of Delegates and one member of the Senate from the related legislative districts. Together with the Northern Virginia Transportation Commission PRTC operates the Virginia Railway Express. By 1986, it became apparent that the jurisdictions outside of NVTC could not reach agreement on how to support VRE by joining NVTC so PRTC was created. Legislation established a 2% motor fuels tax to support VRE expenses and other transportation investments.

PRTC operates a carpooling and vanpooling project called "OmniRide Ridesharing Service" (formerly "OmniMatch").  PRTC participates in the SmarTrip rechargeable fare card program with other public transportation agencies.

Fleet
The PRTC bus fleet consists of the following models:

OmniRide

OmniRide Local (formerly OmniLink)

Fares
 fares are:

Regular Fares

OmniRide Metro Express (formerly OnmiRide Metro Direct)
$4.25 (using cash); $3.45 (using SmarTrip)

OmniRide Express (between Northern Virginia and Washington, DC)
$9.20 (using cash); $6.90 (using SmarTrip)

OmniRide East-West Express
$1.55 (using cash or SmarTrip)

OmniRide Local
$1.55 (using cash or SmarTrip); $3.60 (Day Pass, SmarTrip Only)

Routes

Local
DALELOC Dale City: This route operates between the Omniride Transit Center and to Dale City (Chinn Center) via Dale Blvd and Prince William Pkwy (with weekend service).
DUMFLOC Dumfries: This route operates between the Omniride Transit Center to Dumfries (Fuller Heights) via Route 1 to Freedom High School, Northern Virginia Community College Woodbridge Campus and Ferlazzo Building (with weekend service).
65 Manassas North: This route operates between the City of Manassas to the Northern Virginia Community College Manassas Campus via Sudley Rd (Weekday Service Only).
67 Manassas South: This route operates between the City of Manassas and the  Station via Liberia Ave and Euclid Ave (Weekday Service Only).
68 Manassas Park: This route operates between City of Manassas and to  Station via Manassas Park Community Center and Maplewood Shopping Center (Weekday Service Only).
WOODLOC Woodbridge/Lake Ridge: This route operates in a loop between Omniride Transit Center and to Woodbridge and Lake Ridge via Prince William Pkwy and Old Bridge Rd to Potomac Mills and  Station (with weekend service).
RT1LOC Route 1: This route operates between the  Station and to Quantico via Route 1 (with weekend service).
96 East-West Express: This route operates between the City of Manassas and the Omniride Transit Center via Prince William Pkwy to Potomac Mills (Weekday Service Only).

Metro Express (formerly Metro Direct)
60 Manassas Metro Express: This route operates between the City of Manassas and the Tysons Corner Metro Station. Service to Tysons Corner began July 2014.
61 Linton Hall Metro Express: This route operates between Gainesville and the Tysons Corner Metro Station.  Service began in late 2004. Service to Tysons Corner began July 2014.
Prince William Metro Express: This route operates between Woodbridge and the Franconia–Springfield Metro Station (with weekend service).

Express

L-100/200 Lake Ridge: This route operates Lake Ridge, Pentagon and Crystal City; between Lake Ridge and Downtown Washington; between Lake Ridge and Mark Center.
601/602 Manassas: This route operates between Manassas, Pentagon and Downtown Washington, with connections to Crystal City.
MC-100/200 Montclair: This route operates between Montclair, Pentagon and Downtown Washington.
RS South Route 1: This route operates between Triangle, Dumfries, Woodbridge, Pentagon and Downtown Washington. 
T Tysons Express: This route operates between eastern Prince William County and Tysons Corner.  Service began November 9, 2009.
H Haymarket: This route operates between Haymarket and Rosslyn/Ballston.  Service began December 17, 2018.
543 Stafford-Washington: This route operates between Stafford and Downtown Washington.  Service began November 4, 2019.
942 Stafford-Pentagon: This route operates between Stafford and Pentagon.  Service began November 4, 2019.

References

 This article incorporates material from Virginia Railway Express.

External links
 Official site

Bus transportation in Virginia
Manassas, Virginia
Manassas Park, Virginia
Transportation in Prince William County, Virginia
Local government in Virginia
1986 establishments in Virginia